John Nicholas (1691-1746), of Roundway Park, near Devizes, Wiltshire, was an English politician.

He was the second son of Robert Nicholas of Roundway Park.

He was a Member (MP) of the Parliament of England for Devizes from 1713 to 1715.

He died unmarried. Roundway had been left to his half-brother Edward.

References

1691 births
1746 deaths
People from Devizes
Members of the Parliament of Great Britain for English constituencies
British MPs 1713–1715